Elm Hill Farm Historic District is a historic district on East Main Street east of the junction with Brookfield Road in Brookfield, Massachusetts.  The major contributing element to the district is the Elm Hill Farm complex, one of the largest and most significant farms in the town for more than 100 years.  The complex includes two Federal period residences, two with Queen Anne styling, and four Italianate styled outbuildings.

The district was listed on the National Register of Historic Places in 1991.

See also
National Register of Historic Places listings in Worcester County, Massachusetts

References

Historic districts in Worcester County, Massachusetts
National Register of Historic Places in Worcester County, Massachusetts
Historic districts on the National Register of Historic Places in Massachusetts
Farms on the National Register of Historic Places in Massachusetts